Mirko Andrés Opazo Torrejón (born 9 February 1991) is a Chilean footballer who last played for Chilean Segunda Diviisón side Rodelindo Román as a right-back.

International career
Opazo played the 2011 South American U–20.

Honours

Club
Colo-Colo
 Primera División de Chile (2): 2008, 2009

References

External links
 
 

1991 births
Living people
Footballers from Santiago
Chilean footballers
Chile under-20 international footballers
Colo-Colo footballers
Everton de Viña del Mar footballers
Club Deportivo Palestino footballers
Colo-Colo B footballers
Ñublense footballers
Trasandino footballers
Deportes Melipilla footballers
Deportes La Serena footballers
Rodelindo Román footballers
Chilean Primera División players
Primera B de Chile players
Segunda División Profesional de Chile players
Association football fullbacks